Glyptothorax buchanani is a species of catfish that was first described by Smith, 1945. Glyptothorax buchanani is a species in genus Glyptothorax, family Sisoridae and order Siluriformes. IUCN categorise the species as insufficiently studied globally. No subspecies are listed in Catalogue of Life.

References 

Glyptothorax
Fish described in 1945